Kaplan, Inc. is an American for-profit corporation that provides educational and training services to colleges, universities, businesses and individuals around the world. Founded in 1938 by Stanley Kaplan, the company offers a variety of test preparation, certifications and student support services. The company is headquartered in Fort Lauderdale, Florida, and is a wholly owned subsidiary of Graham Holdings Company.

History
Kaplan, Inc. was founded in 1938 by Stanley H. Kaplan, who started the business by tutoring students for the New York State Regents Exam in the basement of his parents' Brooklyn home. He eventually opened locations around the country. In 1984, Kaplan sold the company to The Washington Post Company.

The company grew significantly in the 1990s by expanding its business and purchasing other test preparation and educational companies.
 The company's leader during this expansion period was Jonathan Grayer.

In 2017, Purdue University announced the acquisition of Kaplan University, and the sale was completed in 2018. The new institution became known as Purdue University Global, and provides accredited distance learning to students throughout the world. Kaplan continues to provide non-academic contractor support for services such as recruitment, marketing, admissions, human resources, and IT support.

Products and services
Kaplan offers a variety of educational and training products and services, including tutoring, on-site classes, live programs, print books, online products and others.

For students and individuals
Educational Test Preparation. Kaplan helps students prepare for 233 standardized tests, such as the ACT, SAT, GRE, GMAT, LSAT, MCAT and many others. 
Professional Training and Licensing Exams. Kaplan offers support to professionals for licensing exams such as nursing, medicine, insurance, real estate, architecture, engineering, finance, accounting, wealth management, law and others.
Tutoring and Admissions Counseling. Kaplan provides tutoring support, and publishes a guide for transfer of credits.  
Language Training. Kaplan offers language training for English, French, German and Spanish, online and in-person at sites around the world. 
Accredited College Study and Degrees. Kaplan supports Purdue University Global, which offers accredited coursework at the associate's, bachelor's, master's, and doctoral levels.

For businesses and educational institutions
Kaplan offers support for technology, admissions, help-desk, marketing, human resources, financial aid processing, recruiting, corporate training, and other business functions.

Kaplan's educational and training include several enterprises:

Kaplan operates Metis, a licensed data science and analytics school and training organization that operates immersive, live online boot camp programs and courses, and conducts training for corporations worldwide.
Kaplan provides healthcare simulation through i-Human Patients, providing simulated patient interactions for use in training and assessing medical health professionals.
Kaplan runs Red Marker, which provides compliance software to identify potential legal and brand risk in any document, enabling review of marketing content to ensure compliance.
Kaplan Financial Education provides training in accounting, financial services, securities trading, insurance and other financial professionals.
PPI2PASS is a Kaplan-owned company that provides more than 35 training programs for engineering, architecture, surveying, interior design, and other professional disciplines.

Corporate overview
According to the company’s website, Kaplan has more than 12,000 employees in more than 30 countries, and reaches more than 100 countries through its online courses. Its partners include more than 14,000 businesses and more than 4000 educational institutions. The company’s chairman and CEO is Andrew Rosen, and its 2020 revenue was $1.3 billion. Kaplan operates through two major divisions: Kaplan North America and Kaplan International. A third division, Kaplan Corporate, manages investment activities in education technology companies.

Kaplan North America (KNA)
Kaplan North America encompasses two segments: Higher Education and Supplemental Education.

KNA higher education provides operations support services for online pre-college, certificate, undergraduate and graduate programs to various educational and training institutions, including Purdue University, Wake Forest University and others. In its support agreement with Purdue University Global, which operates largely online as a public university affiliated with the Purdue University system, KNA provides support for technology, admissions, help-desk, marketing, human resources, financial aid processing, recruiting, and other functions.

KNA supplemental education products include test preparation, data science education and training, healthcare simulation businesses, publishing, professional licensure training and preparation, corporate training and continuing education. KNA’s test preparation services are branded through Kaplan Test Prep, Manhattan Prep and Barron’s Educational Series. In total, KNA test prep prepares students for more than 233 standardized tests, the large majority of which are U.S. focused. Kaplan also sells admissions consulting, tutoring and other student advising services. Kaplan Publishing focuses on print and digital test preparation and reference resources.

Kaplan International (KI)

Kaplan International is based in London and operates educational businesses in North America, Europe, the Asia Pacific region and the Middle East.

KI Pathways was founded in 2005, and serves 20,000 students per year, according to its website.

KI Languages offers instruction in English, Spanish, French and German, and deliver content to countries around the world.

KI has offices and operations in more than 30 countries. For example, KI United Kingdom provides training, test preparation and degrees for accounting, financial services and legal professionals. In the Asia Pacific region, Kaplan operates businesses primarily in Singapore, Australia, New Zealand, Hong Kong and South Korea:

In Singapore, Kaplan operates three business units: Kaplan Higher Education, Kaplan Financial and Kaplan Professional. Kaplan Professional provided short courses to managers, executives, and other business leaders.
In Australia, Kaplan delivers financial services education and professional development courses through Kaplan Professional, as well as higher education programs in business, accounting, hospitality, and tourism and management.
In Hong Kong, Kaplan offers programs ranging from language education and standardized test preparation to corporate and financial training and higher education degree courses.
In South Korea, in addition to university preparation programs, Kaplan delivers A-Level programs and cooperates with several Chinese universities to provide ACCA training programs to students.

Lawsuits and investigations
In 2007, a class-action lawsuit was settled for $30 million by Kaplan and BarBri, a company offering bar exam preparation. Among the allegations was a federal antitrust violation claiming that Kaplan had agreed not to compete in the bar review business while BarBri agreed it would not compete in the LSAT business. Both West Publishing Company (parent of BarBri) and Kaplan denied the allegations and the matter was resolved without any findings of wrongdoing. In a 2010 investigation by the Government Accountability Office (GAO) found deceptive practices at 15 for-profit college campuses, including two owned by Kaplan. In addition, the Florida Attorney General investigated eight for-profit colleges that also included Kaplan for alleged misrepresentation of financial aid and deceptive practices regarding enrollment, recruitment, accreditation, placement and graduation rates. Footage from undercover videos revealed that recruiters from Kaplan in California and Florida had made false or dubious claims to prospective students, such as suggesting massage therapists earn $100 per hour and that student loans do not have to be repaid.

In 2011, a federal judge in Miami has refused to dismiss the lawsuits filed by former employees of Kaplan University and Kaplan Higher Education Corp, who allege that the companies have violated the Higher Education Act in order to gain federal funding and profits. Judge Patricia Seitz has denied the accusations related to Kaplan's manipulation of students' academic records and job-placement statistics, or their incentive payments based on student enrollment numbers. However, she has allowed the whistleblowers to continue to pursue claims of retaliation and other violations. Since 2006, several ex-employees alleged that Kaplan had broken the law and breached its agreement with the U.S. Department of Education by recruiting unqualified students, misleading students about their academic progress, manipulating job placement statistics, and offering bonuses to recruiters based on how many students they enrolled, in order to get the most out of federal funding. In November 2006, two former instructors sued Kaplan for allegedly submitting false claims to the government and not adhering to the Higher Education Act's requirements for payment. The plaintiffs, who were previously employed at Kaplan's Pittsburgh-based campus, claimed that Kaplan had breached the 70 Percent Rule, which requires eligible schools to have a minimum graduation rate and job placement rate of 70%. Furthermore, they argued that Kaplan Career Institute had advertised job-placement rates without providing prospective students with job-placement statistics or state licensing requirements.

In 2012, the North Carolina Attorney General determined that Kaplan had lied to students about the credentials they would earn in the Dental Assistant program. Following the investigation Kaplan College Charlotte campus surrendered its license to operate a school. Kaplan refunded students the cost of tuition, books, and fees, and agreed to pay the program's graduates $9,000 stipends. Students claimed they were told the school would soon obtain ADA accreditation. The program had never been accredited by the American Dental Association, and had never been scheduled for the initial site visit required for accreditation.

In 2014, Kaplan settled with the Florida Attorney General regarding claims of using misleading marketing to enroll students. Kaplan was investigated for violating Florida’s Deceptive and Unfair Trade Practices Act by making misleading statements, misrepresentations, and omitting or failed to disclose material information related to market their programs and schools. Under the terms of the settlement, Kaplan agreed to “clearly and conspicuously disclose true and accurate information relating to the school’s accreditation, program costs, financial aid, and the scope and nature of employment services they provide.” Specifically, Kaplan cannot claim a program is “fully accredited,” can’t say that an interview or recommendation is required, can’t use artificial or arbitrary enrollment deadlines, can’t say a course is in “high demand” or has limited availability if it does not, can’t say that federal grants are “free money,” and can’t enroll a student with regular internet access. Further, Kaplan agreed to retrain to students who asserted claims against the school. During the course of the investigation Kaplan waived $6 million in tuition and fees for more than 2,400 Florida students, and reimburses the Florida Attorney General’s office for attorney costs. Kaplan also reimbursed Bondi’s office for attorney costs.

A year later, Kaplan paid $1.375 million to the Massachusetts Attorney General's office to resolve complaints that Kaplan engaged in “unfair or deceptive practices designed to induce enrollment of students” including “harassing sales tactics and false and misleading representations” in the operation of the  Kaplan Career Institute campus in Boston, Massachusetts. Also in 2015, Kaplan paid $1.3 million, with $1 million going toward tuition refunds to 289 students, to resolve allegations that it hired instructors who were not qualified. The United States Department of Justice began investigating Kaplan following a Qui tam suit filed by a whistleblower under the False Claims Act. The whistleblower alleged Kaplan employed unqualified instructors to teach Medical Assistant courses at its San Antonio campuses and knowingly requested, received, and retained federal funds for courses taught by individuals who did not meet the minimum requirements established by Texas law.

Kaplan Educational Foundation (KEF)

The KEF is a 501(c)(3) charity that offers undergraduate and graduate educational scholarship opportunities and other assistance to students in the New York City area who are traditionally overlooked or under-served, including African American, Latino, and Native American students. Kaplan scholars receive a comprehensive array of financial and academic support, transfer admissions advising, and leadership skills development. The foundation partners with dozens of higher educational institutions around the United States.

In addition to support from its partners and benefactors, the foundation is supported through sales of its guide to college transfer. The guide profiles top U.S. schools and their transfer policies, and is a resource for students and school administrators to navigate the complex transfer process, including credits and graduation requirements. The guide provides specialized advice to non-traditional students, including veterans, students raising families, and students with unique immigration needs. Private citizens may donate these guides to deserving students, and all proceeds from sales are used to support the foundation.

Awards, rankings and honors
Kaplan has been received numerous awards and recognition for its businesses, products and services, including:

Newsweek's 100 Most Loved Workplaces 2021
Sun-Sentinel's South Florida Top Workplaces 2021
Chicago Tribune's Best SAT Test Prep Book for 2021 and 2020 
Chicago Tribune's Best MCAT Test Prep Book 2019 
Fast Company's Most Innovative Education Company 2014

See also
 For-profit higher education in the United States

References

External links
 Kaplan, Inc.
 Kaplan Test Prep
 Article on history of Kaplan's founder by Malcolm Gladwell

Test preparation companies
Education companies established in 1938
Distance education institutions based in the United States
Universities and colleges accredited by the Council on Occupational Education
Education companies of the United States
1938 establishments in Florida